Roger Nkodo Dang (born 6 November 1963) is a Cameroonian politician. He became President of the Pan-African Parliament in 2015. On 27 May 2015, he obtained 85 votes to be elected as the successor to former president Bethel Nnaemeka Amadi. Dang is a member of the National Assembly of Cameroon.

Career 
Dang is a diplomat by training. Under Amadi's presidency from 2012 to 2015, he served as the first vice-president of the Pan-African Parliament, representing the Central Africa Region.

During the 2013 Cameroon People's Democratic Movement (CPDM) nomination process for the Cameroonian legislature, the list that Nkodo Dang led was initially disqualified in favor of that of Jean-Claude Bekolo Mbang. However, the work of Nkodo Dang in the Pan-African Parliament allow him to consider becoming president. The CPDM, under pressure from Cavaye Yeguié Djibril, President of the Assembly, decided to disqualify Bekolo Mbang's list and requalify that of Nkodo Dang. In the election Nkodo Dang returned to his seat at the National Assembly.

Nkodo Dang is a member of the Yebekolo ethnic group, a sub-group of the Boulou people.

References

Living people
Members of the National Assembly (Cameroon)
Members of the Pan-African Parliament from Cameroon
1963 births
Presidents of Pan-African Parliament